Andrej Jordanovski (born 4 January 2000) is a Macedonian basketball player who last played for Feyenoord Basketball. He started his career in 2016 with KK Rabotnički of the Macedonian First League. In his rookie 2016–17 season, he played five games for Vardar's first team and plenty with Rabotnički's first team.

In the 2019–20 season, he played for Feyenoord Basketball of the Dutch Basketball League (DBL).

National team career
Jordanovski played twice for the  U16 team and twice for the U18 team.

References

External links
Andrej Jordanovski on Basketballleague.nl
Andrej Jordanovski on RealGM

2000 births
Living people
Macedonian men's basketball players
Feyenoord Basketball players
KK Vardar players
KK Rabotnički players
Dutch Basketball League players
Point guards
Sportspeople from Rotterdam